In mathematics, a Lusin space or Luzin space, named for N. N. Luzin, may mean:
 In general topology, Polish space #Lusin spaces, image of a Polish space under a bijective continuous map
 In descriptive set theory and general topology, Luzin space or Luzin set, a hypothetical uncountable topological T1 space without isolated points in which every nowhere-dense subset is at most countable